Interstate 69 (I-69) is a proposed Interstate Highway that will pass through the northwestern part of the US state of Louisiana.

Route description
In Louisiana, I-69 would head from the Texas state line near Logansport in a northeasterly direction to intersect I-49 near Stonewall in DeSoto Parish, north of Mansfield. It will then head north to the east of Shreveport to skirt along the southern and eastern edges of Barksdale Air Force Base. It will then intersect I-20 near Haughton in Bossier Parish and then turn northeast and pass Minden, Haynesville, and Shongaloo. Among officials working for this route was Mayor Dennis Freeman of Logansport in DeSoto Parish, who served from 1984 until his death in 2007.

Sections
I-69 has been divided into a number of sections of independent utility (SIUs).

SIU 14
From I-20 near Haughton, Louisiana, I-69 will probably be built on a new alignment toward Haynesville. From Haynesville, the freeway will enter Arkansas and run northeast to U.S. Highway 82 (US 82) west of El Dorado.

SIU 15
SIU 15 continues around the south and east sides of the Shreveport area, crossing I-49 and ending at I-20 near Haughton. The project study area encompasses portions of Bossier, Caddo, and DeSoto parishes. Louisiana Highway 3132 is planned to be extended to I-69 between I-49 and Louisiana Highway 1.

SIU 16
As well as covering the part in Texas northeast of Nacogdoches, SIU 16 also extends into Louisiana, ending at US 171 near Stonewall. Texas is leading the environmental studies on segment 16, with support from Louisiana for the portion within that state. Originally envisioned to be incorporated into the Trans-Texas Corridors (TTC), the tier-one environmental impact statement (EIS) was approved, and a Record of Decision was issued in 2010, favoring the "No-Build" option that abandoned the TTC concept in lieu of upgrading existing U.S. and state highways in the corridor. As a result of the tier-one "No-Build" Record of Decision issued for the TTC concept, a new environmental study will be required for segment 16, which has not been started.

See also

References

External links
 

 Louisiana
69
69